Peter Karl Henrici (13 September 1923 – 13 March 1987) was a Swiss mathematician best known for his contributions to the field of numerical analysis.

Life
Henrici was born in Basel and studied law for two years at University of Basel.  After World War II he transferred to ETH Zürich where he received a diploma in electrical engineering (1948) and a doctorate in mathematics with Eduard Stiefel as his advisor (1952).

Moving to the USA
In 1951 he moved to the United States and worked on a joint contract with American University and the National Bureau of Standards.  Then, from 1956 to 1962, he taught at University of California, Los Angeles where he became a professor. In 1962 he returned to ETH Zürich as a professor, a position he kept for the rest of his life, though he also held a part-time appointment as William R. Kenan, Jr. Distinguished Professor of Mathematics at the University of North Carolina at Chapel Hill from 1985.

Numerical Analyst
An internationally recognized numerical analyst, who published 11 books and more than 80 research papers, Henrici was also a gifted pianist and a highly regarded teacher. He was an editor of a number of scientific journals, including Numerische Mathematik and Zeitschrift für Angewandte Mathematik und Physik.  In 1962, he was a speaker at the International Congress of Mathematicians, and in 1978 he gave the SIAM John von Neumann Lecture.

Peter Henrici Prize
Every four years since 1999, the Peter Henrici Prize is awarded by ETH Zürich and SIAM for "original contributions to applied analysis and numerical analysis and/or for exposition appropriate for applied mathematics and scientific computing".

Publications

References

External links 

 
 

Numerical analysts
20th-century Swiss mathematicians
University of California, Los Angeles faculty
Academic staff of ETH Zurich
University of North Carolina at Chapel Hill faculty
ETH Zurich alumni
Scientists from Basel-Stadt
1923 births
1987 deaths
Swiss expatriates in the United States